The Ireng River (or Maú River, generally used in Portuguese) forms part of Guyana's western border with Brazil.  It flows through the valleys of the Pakaraima Mountains for most of its length. It is the only major river in Guyana which flows from North to South, up to its confluence into the Takutu River. It is one of the northernmost tributaries of the Amazon river system.

The sources of the river are in the  Monte Roraima National Park, created in 1989.
The larger part of the Ireng River basin forms the frontier between Brazil and Guyana. Ireng's main tributaries are the Uailan and Canã rivers on the Brazilian side and the Cacó, Dacã and Socobi rivers on the Guyanese side. All of these rivers merge with the upper and middle sections of the Ireng. Their courses are through breathtaking formations of sedimentary rocks formed by tectonic movements in ancient times. The Ireng River's waters are dark, bearing a striking resemblance to that of Rio Negro near Manaus, in Brazilian state of Amazonas.

It is considered to be the most picturesque of Guyana's many rivers. Orinduik Falls and Takagka Falls are located on the Ireng River.

Biodiversity in the Ireng
The Ireng River region is home to such reptile species as the Antilles leaf-toed gecko (Hemidactylus palaichthus) and rainbow whiptail (Cnemidophorus lemniscatus); amphibians such as the sapo dorado (Bufo guttatus) and Leptodactylus bolivianus; birds including the Muscovy duck (Cairina moschata), black vulture (Coragyps atratus), crested caracara (Caracara plancus), double-striped thick-knee (Burhinus bistriatus) and numerous others; mammals include the South American tapir (Tapirus terrestris), jaguar (Panthera onca) and the red-rumped agouti (Dasyprocta leporina).

References

Rivers of Guyana
Brazil–Guyana border
International rivers of South America
Rivers of Roraima
Border rivers